Sultan Ali ibn al-Hassan Shirazi (c.10th century), was the founder of the Kilwa Sultanate. According to legend, Ali ibn al-Hassan Shirazi was one of seven sons of the Emir Al-Hassan of Shiraz, Persia, his mother an Abyssinian slave. Upon his father's death, Ali was driven out of his inheritance by his warring brothers. Setting sail out of Hormuz, Ali ibn al-Hassan, his household and a small group of followers first made their way to Mogadishu, a commercial port on the East African coast. However, Ali failed to get along with the city's Somali elite and he was soon driven out of that city as well.

Steering down the African coast, Ali is said to have purchased the island of Kilwa from the local Bantu inhabitants. According to one chronicle, Kilwa was originally owned by a mainland Bantu king Almuli and connected by a small land bridge to the mainland that appeared in low tide. The king agreed to sell it to Ali ibn al-Hassan for as much colored cloth as could cover the circumference of the island. But when the king later changed his mind, and tried to take it back, they  had dug up the land bridge, and Kilwa was now an island.

Rather than a literal retelling of events, this legendary history serves to legitimate the dynasty through ties to Islam. According to Horton and Middleman, "the descent from a noble Islamic family and an Abyssinian (Ethiopian) slave 'explains' why the rulers were both black but also with royal Muslim descent; the giving of cloth to the ruler made him 'civilized' and so his daughter became marriageable."

See also
Kilwa Sultanate
Shirazi people
Shirazi era
Shiraz
Swahili people

References

Sources

 Horton, M. and J. Middleton (2000) The Swahili: the social landscape of a mercantile society, Oxford: Blackwell

Sultans
Iranian sailors
10th-century Iranian people
Shirazi people